The Neukom Institute for Computational Science is a collection of offices and laboratory facilities at Dartmouth College in Hanover, New Hampshire. The institute was funded by a donation from Bill Neukom in 2004, then Dartmouth's largest gift for an academic program. The institute provides programs for undergraduates and graduate students as well as encouraging public engagement with computer science through programs such as Neukom Institute Literary Arts Award.

Literary Arts Award
The Neukom Institute Literary Arts Award is presented to celebrate new works of speculative fiction. The three categories are: Speculative Fiction, Debut Speculative Fiction and Playwriting.

Speculative Fiction  
This award is for any work of speculative fiction published in the last two and a half years or that is about to be published.

Recipients 
The inaugural award in 2018 was to Central Station by Lavie Tidhar and On the Edge of Gone by Corinne Duyvis.

Debut Speculative Fiction  
This award is for an author's first work of speculative fiction.

Recipients 
The inaugural award in 2018 was presented to Best Worst American by Juan Martinez.

Playwriting  
This award is for a full-length play addressing the question "What does it mean to be a human in a computerized world?"

Recipients 
The inaugural award in 2018 was presented to Choices People Make by Jessica Andrewartha.

References

External links 
 Neukom Institute homepage
 Neukom Institute Literary Arts Award home page

Dartmouth College facilities
Computational science
American literary awards
American theater awards
Awards established in 2018